Bent County is a county located in the U.S. state of Colorado. As of the 2020 census, the population was 5,650. The county seat and only incorporated municipality is Las Animas. The county is named in honor of frontier trader William Bent.

History
As Colorado experienced population growth following the American Civil War, government had to be closer to the people for commerce and justice to be better served in growing communities. Territorial Bent County was created in February 1870, followed by Greenwood County the following month. The June 1, 1870, Federal Census was several months away and there were plans to apply for statehood. On February 2, 1874, Grand County and Elbert County were formed. On February 6, 1874, Greenwood County was dissolved and divided between Bent and Elbert counties. At the time of this annexation, Bent County included a large portion of southeastern Colorado. In 1889, Bent County acquired its current borders when it was partitioned to create Cheyenne, Lincoln, Kiowa, Otero, and Prowers counties.

Geography

Adjacent counties
Kiowa County - north
Prowers County - east
Baca County - southeast
Las Animas County - southwest
Otero County - west

Major Highways
  U.S. Highway 50
  State Highway 101
  State Highway 109
  State Highway 194
  State Highway 196

State protected area
John Martin Reservoir State Park

Trails and byway
American Discovery Trail
Santa Fe National Historic Trail
Santa Fe Trail National Scenic Byway

Demographics

At the 2000 census, there were 5,998 people, 2,003 households, and 1,388 families in the county. The racial makeup of the county was 79.53% White, 3.65% Black or African American, 2.23% Native American, 0.57% Asian, 10.25% from other races, and 3.77% from two or more races. 30.24% of the population were Hispanic or Latino of any race.

Of the 2,003 households 32.50% had children under the age of 18 living with them, 53.50% were married couples living together, 11.40% had a female householder with no husband present, and 30.70% were non-families. 27.20% of households were one person and 12.20% were one person aged 65 or older. The average household size was 2.53 and the average family size was 3.07.

The age distribution was 23.80% under the age of 18, 9.30% from 18 to 24, 29.20% from 25 to 44, 21.80% from 45 to 64, and 15.90% 65 or older. The median age was 37 years. For every 100 females there were 129.00 males. For every 100 females age 18 and over, there were 138.70 males.

The median household income was $28,125 and the median family income was $34,096. Males had a median income of $22,755 versus $24,261 for females. The per capita income for the county was $13,567. About 16.60% of families and 19.50% of the population were below the poverty line, including 27.40% of those under age 18 and 13.00% of those age 65 or over.

Politics
Bent is a strongly Republican county, although it is less so than the counties to its east. The last Democrat to carry Bent County was Bill Clinton in 1996, although Michael Dukakis in 1988 was the last to gain a majority.

Communities

Cities
Las Animas

Census-designated place
Hasty
McClave

Other unincorporated places
Able
Boggsville
Caddoa
Fort Lyon
Marlman
Melina
Ninaview

Gallery

See also

Outline of Colorado
Index of Colorado-related articles
Colorado census statistical areas
George W. Swink, retailer and cattleman
Greenwood County, Colorado Territory
List of counties in Colorado
National Register of Historic Places listings in Bent County, Colorado

References

Notes

External links
Bent County Government website
Colorado County Evolution by Don Stanwyck
Colorado Historical Society

 

 
1874 establishments in Colorado Territory
Colorado counties
Eastern Plains
Populated places established in 1874